2003 Universiade may refer to:

 2003 Summer Universiade
 2003 Winter Universiade